Sir Arthur Jeff was a British statesman, twice acting Governor of Jamaica, and the co-founder of Putney School of Art and Design in London.

Career
In 1883, Putney School of Art and Design was founded by Sir William Lancaster, Baron Pollock and Sir Arthur Jeff.

Jeff was acting Governor of Jamaica from October 1925–26 April 1926, and 9 November 1932 – 21 November 1932. In 1934, he visited Moneague there to make an assessment of its tourist potential.

References

Governors of Jamaica
Year of birth missing
Year of death missing
Place of birth missing